Adamantothrips is a genus of thrips in the family Phlaeothripidae.

Species
 Adamantothrips asarcopus

References

Phlaeothripidae
Thrips genera